

Fossil evidence

The fossil evidence of fire comes mainly from charcoal.  The earliest charcoal dates to the Silurian period. Charcoal results from organic matter exposed to high temperatures, which drives off volatile elements and leaves a carbon residue. Charcoal differs from coal, which is the fossilised remains of living plants and burns to leave soot.

Fossil charcoal is known as fusain, a crumbly silky material which may form blocks or microscopic films. Plants can be preserved in exquisite detail, and original cell structures can often be preserved in three dimensions. Spectacular images can be recovered using scanning electron microscopy.  Fragments can be distributed some distance, and soot-rich layers in strata deposited by deltas can provide a 'time-averaged' record of fire activity in the catchment (and up-wind) area of the river.

The loss of volatile elements during combustion means that charred remnants are usually smaller than the original organism, but this same factor makes them unlikely to be eaten by any animals (for they have no nutritional value), enhancing their preservation potential.

Evidence of lightning strikes is usually difficult to link to specific fires; occasionally they may scorch trees, but fulgarites - fused sediments where soil has been melted together by a strike - are occasionally preserved in the geological record from the Permian onwards.
Scorched layers of trees which survived fires can also provide evidence of fire frequency - especially as they can be related to the annual growth rings of the affected tree.  These are useful for relatively recent times, but there are only putative reports of this phenomenon in pre-Tertiary strata.

Geochemical evidence
The amount of oxygen in the atmosphere is the major control on the abundance of fire; this can be approximated by a number of proxies.

Development through time
Fires among the low, scrubby, wetland plants of the Silurian can only have been limited in scope.  Not until the forests of the Middle Devonian could large-scale wildfires really gain a foothold.  Fires really took off in the high-oxygen, high-biomass period of the Carboniferous, where the coal-forming forests frequently burned; the coal that is the fossilised remains of those trees may contain as much as 10-20% charcoal by volume. These represent fires which may have had approximately a 100-year repeat cycle.

At the end of the Permian, oxygen levels plummeted, and fires became less common. In the early Triassic, after the largest naturally-caused extinction event in Earth's history at the end of the Permian, there is an enigmatic coal gap, suggesting a very low biomass; this is accompanied by a paucity of charcoal throughout the entire Triassic period.

Fires again become significant in the late Jurassic through the Cretaceous. They are especially useful as charcoalified flowers provide a key piece of evidence for tracking the origin of the angiosperm lineage.  Contrary to popular perception, there is no evidence of a global inferno at the end of the Cretaceous, when many lineages were driven to extinction, most notably all non-avian dinosaurs; the record of fire after this point is somewhat sparse until the advent of human intervention around half a million years ago, although this may be biased by a lack of investigations from this period.

Notes

References

Further reading

Wildfires